Tyoply Ruchey is a rural locality (a settlement) in Verkhovazhskoye Rural Settlement, Verkhovazhsky District, Vologda Oblast, Russia. The population was 569 as of 2002. There are 9 streets.

Geography 
Tyoply Ruchey is located 2 km northeast of Verkhovazhye (the district's administrative centre) by road. Verkhovazhye is the nearest rural locality.

References 

Rural localities in Verkhovazhsky District